Robert Guri Baqaj (born 12 September 1990), also known as Gurakuq Baqaj, is a Swedish footballer of Kosovar descent who plays for FC Rosengård as a forward.

Career
Baqaj was signed by Italian Serie B club AlbinoLeffe in 2009 and spent 1-year at its Primavera team. In July 2010, he was loaned to Allsvenskan club Halmstad. and completed on 10 August 2010. He also played two friendlies for Halmstad before available to Halmstad for official matches. He made his league debut on 16 August 2010, substituted Emir Kujović in the second half.

On 23 July 2012, Baqaj signed for Swedish Division 3 club KSF Prespa Birlik.

References

External links
 
 
 Fotbolltransfers profile

1990 births
Living people
Footballers from Malmö
Association football forwards
Swedish footballers
Allsvenskan players
Malmö FF players
IF Limhamn Bunkeflo (men) players
U.C. AlbinoLeffe players
Halmstads BK players
KSF Prespa Birlik players
FC Rosengård 1917 players